Mainstream is an early demo EP from Canadian indie rock band Metric. The album is currently not available in stores, although it is circulated widely on the internet. It was revealed in the 2009 book This Book is Broken, that the band was called "Mainstream" at this time, not "Metric", and Joshua Winstead and Joules Scott-Key had not yet joined.

Track listing

1998 debut EPs
Metric (band) EPs